Piz Fora is a mountain in the Bernina Range (Alps), on the border of Italy and Switzerland.

Geography 
The Sassa di Fora, Piz Fora on CNS, is a massive and complex mountain located centrally on the Alpine chain, between the Valmalenco and Alta Engadina. It forms the final high elevations on the western side, and its summit is towered over by the Bernina Group; three distinct and slightly inclined ridges.

The northwest face of these ridges make up the head of Val Fedoz and is usually by the Vadrec da Fedoz; a great glacial plateau below the summit. The northeastern side, also covered with ice, has a steeper incline than the west but face less impressive views, mainly, the Vadret dal Güz and Vadret da Fex which form the western summit of the Val Fex. On the south side lies the most impressive structure of the Bernina Group, the Gold Pass. From  Fuorcla to Chapütsch in the east, it spans 3 km and is more than 600 m high in some areas. Under the steep slopes of the Fora nozzle the only glacial extension of the southern slope is the small glacier, Sassa Fora.

Expeditions to the summit of this beautiful mountain begin in Chiareggio in Valmalenco, or from Sils-Maria in the Engadin.  Both routes have similar difficulties and travel times. The southern path has the advantage of being much more scenic and open while also reducing 300 meters in altitude, but it is more complex. In both cases, no footholds ease the long and tiring climb. The trek is appropriate only for well-trained climbers.

Report of the climb 
 Top n ° 1846 
 Rising slope: SW-W-SW 
 Difference of ascent: 1800 m - Total: 3600 m 
 Rise Time: 6.30 h - Total: 11.30 h 
 Recommended season: Summer

Climb

Ascent 
At Chiareggio the road leads to Passo del Muretto. A path shortens the route and partly follows the road to a junction. At this point, a detour leads to the Golden Alpe (q. 2010 m). An alpine pasture offers a panoramic facade of the north, named Accident and Monte del Forno, which briefly follows east leading to Val Nevasco. Continue a hundred meters north, leaving the path, into a sparse forest avoids the rocky prominence and steep slopes above them.  At about (q. 2400 m) is Dosso Calvo, plateau pastureland east of the grassy spur. At the highest part of the plateau a grassy rib shape is to the left. It is steep and leads along the ridge of the hill above. The path becomes more evident from there. It turns to the left (W), and then enters into the wall. An easy 100 m channel of broken rocks leads to a logical easy path on the left (I °), in the direction of the now visible Golden step (q. 3083 m), from Furcela Fedoz on the CNS with a difficulty level of F. The pass leads onto the glacier (exhibiting numerous crevasses) losing a few tens of meters in altitude. Crossing towards the north, in the direction of the steep icy slope that connects the bottom of the hanging glacier with the plateau below the summit. The path moves to the right and follows a serac area, with slender bridges of ice and partition walls. The path continues in the direction of the mountain NNW ridge through the crevassed glacier. Next comes the plateau which turns towards the SSE and slopes gently, on a long traverse in the direction of a steep icy chute to the SW ridge. The bergschrund can create serious problems, in most cases, it towers to the right of a providential bridge. The icy slope climb spans up about fifty meters, at about 50/55 °. Crossing requires ice screws. This ends the difficult part of the journey and the broad SW ridge leaning slightly to the right, leads to the summit.

Descent 

The plateau is accessible from the top edge of the ice chute by abseiling down the chute, continuing along the easy SW crest, passing the first projecting rock and ending down a shorter icy slope than the rising, further continuing along the SW ridge to the Gold Pass (normal route), using a guide of the CAI / TCI Monti of Italy: Bernina. In any case, the descent continues along the ascent itinerary.

References

External links
 Piz Fora on Hikr

Mountains of the Alps
Mountains of Graubünden
Mountains of Lombardy
Alpine three-thousanders
Italy–Switzerland border
International mountains of Europe
Mountains of Switzerland